Black Lake is a lake in geographic LeCaron Township in the Unorganized North Part of Algoma District in Northeastern Ontario, Canada. It is part of the Great Lakes Basin.

There are four unnamed inflows: two at the west, including one that arrives from Portage Lake; and two at the northeast. The primary outflow, at the southeast, is an unnamed creek that flows to Endikai Lake, which in turn flows via the West Little White River, the Little White River and the Mississagi River to the North Channel on Lake Huron.

See also
List of lakes of Ontario

References

Other map sources:

Lakes of Algoma District